Malinovka is a rural locality (a village) and the administrative centre of Abulyaisovsky Selsoviet, Zianchurinsky District, Bashkortostan, Russia. The population was 345 as of 2010. There are 4 streets.

Geography 
Malinovka is located 59 km southeast of Isyangulovo (the district's administrative centre) by road. Abulyaisovo is the nearest rural locality.

References 

Rural localities in Zianchurinsky District